Thailepidonia is a genus of moths in the family Lecithoceridae. It contains the species Thailepidonia yoshiyasui, which is found in Thailand.

References

Lecithocerinae
Monotypic moth genera